Ravid (lit. "Necklace") is a small kibbutz in northern Israel. Located to the west of the Sea of Galilee, it falls under the jurisdiction of Emek HaYarden Regional Council.

History
Ravid was established in 1981 by members of the Takam movement as part of the Galilee lookouts programme, including 10 families who had moved from cities. The site was land that had belonged to the depopulated Palestinian village of al-Mansura until the 1948 Arab–Israeli War, southeast of the village site.

However, after a social crisis, the kibbutz was dismantled. It was successfully re-established in 1994 by former members of HaNoar HaOved VeHaLomed, and is now part of the Dror-Israel movement.

References

Kibbutzim
Kibbutz Movement
Populated places established in 1981
Populated places in Northern District (Israel)
1981 establishments in Israel